Several golf tournaments have been sponsored by Volvo and titled as the Volvo Masters:
Volvo Asian Masters, held in Taiwan in 1995.
Volvo Masters, part of the European Tour from 1988 to 2008.
Volvo Masters of Asia, replacing the Volvo Masters of Malaysia, an Asian Tour event held from 2002 to 2008.
Volvo Masters of Latin America, a South American Tour event held in Brazil in 1996
Volvo Masters of Malaysia, held from 1994 to 2001, and an Asian Tour event from 1997.
Volvo Masters of Thailand, held in 1995 and 1996.

Other sporting events to carry the name Volvo Masters include:
ATP Finals, a tennis tournament on the ATP Tour, known as the Volvo Masters between 1980 and 1984.

See also
Volvo Open (disambiguation)